Barry Shelley Brook (November 1, 1918, New York City – December 7, 1997, New York City) was an American musicologist.

Education & academia 
Brook received his master's degree from Columbia University, where he studied with Paul Henry Lang, Erich Hertzmann (1902–1963), Hugh Ross, and Roger Sessions, in 1942; he received the doctorate from the Sorbonne in 1959. He became a fellow at City College of New York (1940–42), continued at Queens College (1945–89), and founded the graduate program in music at the City University of New York in 1967; he served as the program’s Executive Officer until his retirement in 1989.

Brook taught frequently at the Sorbonne. In 1984, the Centre National de la Recherche Scientifique asked him to design a new doctoral program in musicology at the École Normale Supérieure in Paris. Along with his duties at City University, he spent much time teaching in that new program in Paris.

Brook’s research interests included Renaissance secular music, 18th- and 19th-century music and aesthetics, music iconography, and the sociology of music. He served as editor of a facsimile edition of the Breitkopf Thematic Catalogues (New York, 1966), an important source for the identification and dating of 18th-century compositions. His interest in music bibliography and its history led him to found RILM, the first international bibliography of music scholarship, in 1966; he served as the project’s Editor-in-Chief until 1989.

Although he was known principally for his work in classical music, in the later years of his life Brook became fascinated with ethnomusicology. He often sought out and trained budding music historians in how to bring their reports and studies of local music traditions into the mainstream, academic world of music history.

External links
 Biography: The Barry S. Brook Center for Music Research and Documentation, Graduate Center, The City University of New York

References 

1918 births
1997 deaths
City College of New York faculty
Queens College, City University of New York faculty
City University of New York faculty
Columbia University alumni
University of Paris alumni
20th-century American musicologists